Isaac Kiprono Ruto (born 4 March 1959) is a Kenyan politician. He is the Chama Cha Mashinani Party leader. He was elected the first governor of Bomet County in 2013 Kenyan general elections. He hails from Tumoi, Sigor in Chepalungu constituency and studied Political Science at the University of Nairobi. He is also a former chairman of the Council of Governors in Kenya.

Political career 

Ruto joined active politics in the year 1997 and was elected as the Chepalungu Constituency member of parliament through Kenya African National Union. In 1998, Ruto was appointed as assistant minister to the Ministry of Education, a position he served until 1999 when reappointed as an assistant minister to the Ministry of Agriculture. In 2001, President Moi appointed Ruto as Minister of Environment and Natural Resources.

In 2002 Kenyan general elections Ruto was defeated by Ambassador John Koech as a member of parliament Chepalungu Constituency.

In 2007 general elections, Ruto was elected for a third consecutive term as the representative for his Chepalungu Constituency on an Orange Democratic Movement ticket.

In 2013 general elections, Ruto was elected Bomet County governor on the URP ticket under Jubilee Coalition.

In April 2013, Ruto was elected the first chairman of the Council of Governors through consensus and vowed to fight for devolution. In 2017 he became leader of the Chama Cha Mashinani political party. In the year 2017 Ruto vied through Chama Cha Mashinani and lost his gubernatorial position during elections to the late Joyce Laboso who vied through Jubilee ticket.

References

External links 

Living people
County Governors of Kenya
Members of the National Assembly (Kenya)
1967 births
People from Uasin Gishu County